Micropterix cyaneochrysa is a species of moth belonging to the family Micropterigidae that was described by Walsingham, Lord Thomas de Grey, in 1907, and is known from Algeria.

References

Micropterigidae
Moths described in 1907
Endemic fauna of Algeria
Moths of Africa